丁 may refer to:

 Ding (surname)
 One of the celestial stems
 Đinh dynasty
 Dinh (surname)